Nerisyrenia is a genus of flowering plants belonging to the family Brassicaceae.

Its native range is from the southern-central United States to north-eastern Mexico.

Species
The following species are recognised in the genus Nerisyrenia:

Nerisyrenia baconiana 
Nerisyrenia camporum 
Nerisyrenia castillonii 
Nerisyrenia gracilis 
Nerisyrenia gypsophila 
Nerisyrenia hypercorax 
Nerisyrenia incana 
Nerisyrenia johnstonii 
Nerisyrenia linearifolia 
Nerisyrenia mexicana 
Nerisyrenia powellii

References

Brassicaceae
Brassicaceae genera